Marc MacMillan is an American baseball coach and former utility player. He played college baseball at Ole Miss for coach Don Kessinger from 1993 to 1996. He then served as the head coach of the Crichton Comets in 2009.

Coaching career
MacMillian began his coaching career as the head baseball coach at Memphis University School. On September 16, 2008, MacMillan was hired as the head baseball coach at Crichton College. On January 23, 2014, MacMillan was named Director of Operations at Ole Miss. On January 6, 2016, MacMillan was promoted to volunteer assistant with the Ole Miss.

On May 15, 2020, MacMillan was named the head baseball coach of the Charleston Southern Buccaneers.

Head coaching record

References

External links
Ole Miss Rebels bio

1973 births
Living people
Ole Miss Rebels baseball players
High school baseball coaches in the United States
Arkansas–Monticello Boll Weevils baseball coaches
Arkansas–Pine Bluff Golden Lions baseball coaches
Ole Miss Rebels baseball coaches
Charleston Southern Buccaneers baseball coaches